The cTuning Foundation is a global non-profit organization developing open-source tools and a common methodology to enable sustainable, collaborative and reproducible research in Computer science, perform collaborative optimization of realistic workloads across devices provided by volunteers, enable self-optimizing computer systems,
and automate artifact evaluation at machine learning and systems conferences and journals.

Notable projects 

 Collective Knowledge - an open-source framework to organize software projects as a database of reusable components with common automation actions and extensible meta descriptions based on FAIR principles, implement portable research workflows, and crowdsource experiments across diverse platforms provided by volunteers.
 ACM ReQuEST - Reproducible Quality-Efficient Systems Tournaments to co-design efficient software/hardware stacks for deep learning algorithms in terms of speed, accuracy and costs across diverse platforms, environments, libraries, models and data sets
 MILEPOST GCC - open-source technology to build machine learning based self-optimizing compilers.
 CK crowd-tuner - universal, customizable and multi-objective autotuner.
 CK package and environment manager - python CK API to detect, install and rebuild code and data dependencies for CK workflows.
 Artifact Evaluation - validation of experimental results from published papers at the computer systems and machine learning conferences.
 Reproducible Papers - a public index of reproducible papers with portable workflows and reusable research components.

History 

Grigori Fursin developed cTuning.org at the end of the Milepost project in 2009
to continue his research on machine learning based program and architecture optimization as a community effort.

In 2014, cTuning Foundation was registered in France 
as a non-profit research and development organization. 
It received funding from the EU TETRACOM project 
and ARM to develop the Collective Knowledge Framework
and prepare reproducible research methodology for ACM and IEEE conferences.

In 2020, cTuning Foundation joined MLCommons as a founding member to accelerate innovation in ML.

Funding 

Current funding comes from the European Union research and development funding programme, Microsoft, and other organizations.

References

Free software project foundations
Standards organizations in France
International organizations based in France